Olympique Riadhi de Mascara, or simply Olympique Mascara, is an Algerian football club located in Mascara, Algeria. The club was founded in 1965 and its colours are green and black. Their home stadium, Stade Meflah Aoued, has a capacity of 15,000 spectators.

History
The club was founded in 1965 under the name of Olympique Sempac de Mascara. In 1982, the club changed its name to Olympique Sportive de Mascara. During 1976 and 1979, the club played in the second division.
In 1986 the club was dissolved. In 2006, it was recreated and played until now in the sixth division.

Former players
Lakhdar Belloumi
Mokhtar Baghdous

References

Sources
 Lakhdar Belloumi, pur sang algérien – afrik-foot.com

Football clubs in Algeria
Association football clubs established in 1965
GC Mascara
1965 establishments in Algeria
Sports clubs in Algeria